Ping Pong Summer is a 2014 American independent coming-of-age comedy film written and directed by Michael Tully. The film had its world premiere at 2014 Sundance Film Festival on January 18, 2014.

Gravitas Ventures acquired the distribution rights of the film; they released the film theatrically and by video on demand on June 6, 2014. Millennium Entertainment handled the home release of the film.

Plot summary 
In 1985, 13-year-old Rad Miracle goes on a summer vacation to Ocean City, Maryland, with his family. Experiencing many things for the first time, he finds a mentor for his obsession with ping pong.

Production

Development 
Director Michael Tully has said that the movie was inspired by growing up with 1980s Hollywood films, ping pong and sunny summer times in Ocean City, Maryland. With Ping Pong Summer he also wanted to pay tribute to those comedy filmmakers from the 1980s that took their time to craft heart-felt stories. Tully focused on breaking the "connect-the-dot" contemporary comedy by infusing personal experience and genuine characters. Tully grew up in Maryland, and he and his family vacationed at the resort where he shot the movie when he was an adolescent.

George Rush and Tully collaborated on the sale of Tully's last film, Septien. Rush had worked primarily as an entertainment lawyer, but took on the role of producer for Ping Pong Summer. Tully had been polishing the script since 1992 and was eager to make a movie so reminiscent of his childhood. The duo had a clear vision for the look and feel of the movie. They wanted to make a movie that truly captured the 1980s culture and felt like it was an old reel someone had found in a vault. Wyatt Garfield was instrumental in designing a specific look in the cinematography. Also, by casting generational icons like Susan Sarandon and Lea Thompson, they were able to pay homage to time periods that parents in the audience would be familiar with.

In the opening shots of the film, viewers see a boom box, Nike shoes, and a Run-D.M.C. tape, which, as NPR wrote, are "cultural markers that would clearly peg the film to a particular decade even without a subtitle further specifying the year: 1985."

Pre-production 
The production opened up in Ocean City, Maryland. According to Tully the town was excellent at preserving the nostalgic feel of summer vacations. The local authorities and citizens were very cooperative with the filmmakers. To further capture the style of the movie, the entire picture was shot on Super 16 film stock. Tully felt very passionate about this choice and it was approved by Rush and the other producers.

The film was shot in Ocean City, Maryland, marking the first time since 1986 (Violets Are Blue) that a movie was filmed there.

Cast

Awards 

Ping Pong Summer played at the 2014 Sarasota Film Festival where it won the Audience Award for Best Narrative Feature Film.

Reception
Ping Pong Summer received mixed reviews from critics. Review aggregator Rotten Tomatoes reports that 55% of 29 film critics have given the film a positive review, with a rating average of 5.7 out of 10.

Justin Lowe in his review for The Hollywood Reporter praised the film, saying that "Rose-tinted as the film's perspective may be, Ping Pong Summer is still a lingering, entertaining glance back at an era that Americans just can't seem to get enough of, whether in music or movies." Mark Adams of Screen International wrote that "Ping Pong Summer may well feel rather familiar, but there is a lot of good-natured and very accessible fun to be had about its tale of one 13-year-old's dream of glory on the table tennis table." Chris Michael, in his review for The Guardian, said "It's gawky and awkward, but just like Rad's breakdancing worm, this one gets better as it goes along."

NPR was less positive, with reviewer Tomas Hachard calling the film "a sometimes intriguing experiment in upended expectations, though not a particularly successful one," that was largely lacking "coherent purpose". Calum Marsh of Film.com criticized Ping Pong Summer as "a cool ninety minutes of vapid 80s fetishism packaged to resemble a proper feature film" that was "resoundingly pointless".  Jeannette Catsoulis of The New York Times focused criticism on the "limp hero" and "lifeless plot", arguing that the positive qualities of the film did not "excuse characters that are little more than props for embarrassing fashion or delivery systems for dated slang." Ann Hornaday at The Washington Post argued that "its relatively uninvolving story, starchily directed by Tully and given little zing by an uneven cast, makes 'Ping Pong Summer'" an "okay-not-great" film.

References

External links
 Ping Pong Summer – official website
 
 
 

2014 films
American comedy films
2014 comedy films
Films about vacationing
Films set in the 1980s
Films set in 1985
Films set in Maryland
2010s English-language films
Eastern Shore of Maryland in fiction
Ocean City, Maryland
2010s American films